The Game in Time of War is a collection of essays and newspaper articles written by Australian journalist Martin Flanagan about Australian rules football. The theme of the content is analysis of the relation between Australian football and the participation of Australian people in wars.
Ross Fitzgerald wrote that the book's first essay described the impact of 9/11 on Australian football in compelling terms, but that it was a disjointed "Stream of consciousness" in the other essays.

References

External links
 National Library of Australia book record

History of Australian rules football
Australian rules football culture
Essay collections
2003 non-fiction books
Pan Books books